Somnath Adhikari (born 6 January 1951) affectionately known as Pyasi (meaning "thirsty" in Nepali), is a Nepalese politician serving as the 2nd and current Governor of Province No. 1 of Nepal. He is former member of the National Panchayat from 1986 to 1991 and member of Pratinidhi Sabha from 1991 to 1994. He is an active politician of CPN (ML) now CPN (UML) from 1968 and served as the district president of Kaski and later he hold the president post of the party election committee.

Personal life
Pyasi was born in Batulechaur, Kaski district to Liladhar Adhikari and Sabitri Adhikari. He did his secondary education from local government school and later finished his Bachelor degree from Prithivi Narayan Campus, Pokhara.

References

|-

Living people
People from Kaski District
1951 births
Nepalese communists
Governors of Koshi Province
Nepal MPs 1991–1994
Members of the Rastriya Panchayat
Prithvi Narayan Campus alumni